The Yellow Line, alternatively known as the Skokie Swift, is a branch of the Chicago "L" in Chicago, Illinois. The  route runs from the Howard Terminal on the north side of Chicago, through the southern part of Evanston and to the Dempster Terminal in Skokie, Illinois making one intermediate stop at Oakton Street in Skokie.

At Howard, Yellow Line passengers can transfer to the Purple or Red Lines of the "L". The Yellow Line is the only "L" line that does not go to The Loop and is the only "L" train route that is fully ADA accessible. It is also unique in that it runs in a below-grade trench for part of its length, even though it has no underground portions and does not run in an expressway median. It also includes grade segments and crossings at the northern portion of the line. It was built using the tracks of the former Chicago North Shore and Milwaukee Railroad's high-speed Skokie Valley Route.

Extending the line to Old Orchard Mall in Skokie has been discussed. At one time, the line had several intermediate stops in Evanston and Skokie, but these stations have long been out of use and dismantled. In June 2010, however, construction began on a new station at Oakton, which opened on April 30, 2012.

Trains operate using the Bombardier-built 5000-series railcars; each train consists of two cars. Average weekday boardings of 897 were reported in 2021, making it by far the least-used route in the CTA rail system. Until late 2009, the Yellow Line was operated with the 3200-series cars that were specially equipped with roof boards that, until late 2004, held pantographs (the roof boards remain on cars 3441-3456 to this day even after they were officially reassigned to the Brown Line). Occasionally, the Yellow Line borrows cars from the Red Line when short on cars.

Route
The Yellow Line begins at the Dempster-Skokie terminal located at 5005 Dempster Street in Skokie. A stub track extends north of the station to allow trains to switch ends. The line runs south from Dempster-Skokie at street level. After crossing Oakton Street, the Yellow Line turns east and crosses over Skokie Boulevard (U.S. Route 41). After the East Prairie Road grade crossing, the tracks rise to become an elevated route. 

At this point, the route passes the Skokie Shops CTA maintenance facility and crosses over the North Shore Channel. After passing over Dodge Avenue, the tracks descend into a trench. The line then rises to serve the elevated Howard station. A small segment extends south of the station to allow Yellow and Purple Line trains to switch ends.

Operating hours and headways
The Yellow Line operates between Dempster-Skokie and Howard daily between 4:45 a.m. and 11:15 p.m. on weekdays, and between 6:15 a.m. and 11:15 p.m. on weekends and holidays. Service frequencies range from six trains per hour during rush hour to four trains per hour during other times.

History

Niles Center Branch
The Yellow Line originally began as the Niles Center Branch of the old Chicago Rapid Transit Company (CRT). The rapid transit service began as part of the Chicago North Shore and Milwaukee Railroad's high-speed Skokie Valley interurban line on a five-mile (8 km) section between Howard Terminal and Dempster Street, Niles Center. It was placed in operation on March 28, 1925.

The route included several intermediate stops through Evanston and Skokie (then called Niles Center) at Ridge, Asbury, Dodge, Crawford/East Prairie, Kostner, Oakton and Main. On March 27, 1948, the Chicago Transit Authority (who had just bought out the Chicago Rapid Transit Company in 1947) discontinued service over the Niles Center Branch and replaced it with the 97 Skokie bus route. The stations were closed and remained abandoned for the next 15 years.

On January 21, 1963, the Chicago North Shore and Milwaukee Railroad ceased all of its operations and later that year,  of trackage between Howard and Dempster was purchased by the CTA. The intermediate stations were not reopened. Some of the vacant station houses were used by other businesses, including a convenience store and an electrical supplier, before finally being demolished in the 1980s.

The Skokie Swift
The Skokie Swift high-speed (5 miles in  minutes) shuttle service, between Howard Street in Chicago and Dempster Street in Skokie, was inaugurated on April 20, 1964, as a federally-aided mass transportation demonstration project. Participation in the net project costs was divided between the United States Department of Housing and Urban Development, CTA and the Village of Skokie.

The success of this project had attracted nationwide attention. On its first day of service, Skokie Swift carried nearly 4,000 passengers in a 16-hour period compared to approximately 1,600 passengers carried by the North Shore Line from the Dempster Terminal in a 12-hour period before the railroad terminated. Ridership continued to increase and by the end of the first year, nearly 6,000 passengers were riding the new line each weekday.

Because of the weekday success, Saturday service was inaugurated, with more than 2,000 riders. At the end of the two-year experimental period, 3.5 million people had used the new service and CTA authorized operation of the Skokie Swift as a permanent part of its rapid transit system.

The success of the Skokie Swift route demonstrated that many motorists will forsake their cars when high-speed mass transit is provided and to a minor extent, gave birth to the first use of light rail before the term was ever coined.

One of the distinctive features of the five-mile (8 km) line was that approximately half was equipped with third rail while the other half was equipped with catenary left over from the Chicago North Shore & Milwaukee Railroad. Trains switched non-stop from third rail to overhead and vice versa using distinctive pan trolleys designed by Skokie Swift Project Manager George Krambles.

On February 9, 1992, Saturday service was discontinued during a service reduction by CTA. The "Skokie Swift" name was changed to the "Yellow Line" in 1993, when all Chicago 'L' lines were renamed for colors. The original logo of the "Skokie Swift" continues to be used today on signage and LED route displays of the Bombardier-built 5000-series rail cars for service towards Skokie. The Dempster Street Terminal was completely rebuilt from 1993 to 1994, with a new station house and train platforms. In 2003, the old brick station building (designed by architect Arthur U. Gerber) was moved  to the east, then was restored and converted into commercial property.

The Skokie Swift was the only Chicago Transit Authority rapid transit line to use overhead catenary for electrification. It was also the last Chicago Transit Authority rapid transit line to use overhead, as portions of the Evanston and Lake Street lines used conventional trolley overhead until 1973, and 1962 respectively. Third-rail electrification was installed in 2004 to increase reliability, allow compatibility with other rapid-transit lines and reduce maintenance costs.

In 2008, Saturday service was restored and brand new Sunday service was added.

Addition of downtown Skokie station

A groundbreaking ceremony marking the start of construction of a new intermediate stop on the Yellow Line, Oakton–Skokie, took place on June 21, 2010. The station is located in downtown Skokie and was the first new CTA station built since 2001. The new station opened on April 30, 2012.

2015 embankment collapse
On May 17, 2015, a section of the embankment west of McCormick Boulevard collapsed, causing the entire track to be damaged. The collapse was due to a failure in construction at the adjacent O'Brien Water Reclamation Plant. No trains could operate either way due to the track condition. At 10:00 PM on that day, an emergency closure of the Yellow Line was called. Yellow Line service returned on October 30, 2015, with the CTA offering free rides for one week and free parking at the Dempster-Skokie Terminal through the end of 2015.

Canceled projects
Upon the successful reopening of the Oakton station, it was determined that stations at Dodge, Asbury or Ridge in southern Evanston could be built or rebuilt and added to the Yellow Line as well. In 2012, a local study found Asbury to be the most feasible of the three potential southern Evanston Yellow Line stations. As of 2019, the CTA website does not indicate that the Asbury project is being considered.

Branch to Montrose
In the past several years, there have been plans to build a branch of the Yellow Line from Oakton to Montrose with a connection to the Blue Line.

After August 2008, two corridors remained for further study, the alignment along the Union Pacific Railroad (bus and heavy rail) as well as a combined track along Gross Point Road and Skokie Blvd (bus only). As of April 30, 2009, the two corridors have been narrowed down to one option - an elevated single track rail corridor that will follow the Union Pacific Railroad right of way. Under the most recent version of the plan, the Old Orchard terminal will be elevated.

Cancelled Extension to Old Orchard
This extension was cancelled.

Station listing

Bus connections

At Howard
CTA
 22 Clark
 97 Skokie
 147 Outer DuSable Lake Shore Express
 201 Central/Ridge
 206 Evanston Circulator

Pace
 213 Green Bay Road
 215 Crawford-Howard
 290 Touhy Avenue

At Oakton
CTA
 54A North Cicero/Skokie Blvd.
 97 Skokie

Pace
 210 Lincoln Ave.
 226 Oakton St. (3 blocks west)

At Dempster
CTA
 54A North Cicero/Skokie Blvd.
 97 Skokie

Pace
 250 Dempster Street
 620 Yellow Line Dempster - Allstate
 626 Skokie Valley Limited

The Skokie Swift station on Dempster has two parking lots, a South Lot is directly adjacent to the Skokie Swift station and a North Lot across Dempster street. The fee is $3 per day for the South Lot and $2 per day for the North Lot payable in the fee boxes at the station. In 2014, token parking payment was discontinued. The fee must now be paid with cash, credit or debit cards.

References

External links

 Yellow Line at CTA official site

 
Railway lines in Chicago
Skokie, Illinois
Railway lines opened in 1925
Railway lines closed in 1948
Railway lines opened in 1964
1925 establishments in Illinois
1948 disestablishments in Illinois
1964 establishments in Illinois